Prince Tochukwu Nnake (born 26 September 1989) is a Nigerian football player currently playing .

Career
Nnake was born in Port Harcourt and began his career 2010 for Dolphins F.C. played in the 2nd division of the NPFL and was also in the CAF confederation at the same time, NNAKE PRINCE was Dolphin leading scorer in CAF and was invited to the senior national team. in 2009 transferred to Sharks F.C. On 20 February 2010 was loaned out from his club Sharks F.C. to the Belgian League club R. Union Saint-Gilloise. He scored in his first ten games for his new club R. Union Saint-Gilloise four goals.in his second game against F.C. Bocholt and finished the league with eight goals, that made him tied up with two of his teammate who started the league, and they all finishing with eight goals each And in 2011 was with grasshopper for 5 month but could not secure a contract because of his engagement with his nigerian team that won't release him. and in 2012 was with Kwara United for half season and now playing for (Tersana SC) in Cairo capital city of Egypt. He later moved to (Alassiouty Sport) where he currently plays. He scored his first league game for his club in the premiere league against Zamalek SC.

Prince Nnake moved to norther cyprus and joined Turk Ocagi Limasol S.K (TOL SK), before moving to join malaysian premiere league team SABAH FA, where he played and attracted lots of fan in the city of sabah with he's fast paced style of play, he scored total of 9 goals and after a season he moved and joined AL-HEJAZ in saudi arabia.
NNAKE PRINCE had a wonderful season after joining the arabian side, they had a very good season and NNAKE PRINCE was the league 2nd top scorers that season with 14 goals making him AL-HEJAZ leading scorer that season.

He moved to Saudi club Al-Hejaz in 2018.

References

http://www.ghanafa.org/news/200804/2844.php
 http://mtnfootball.com/news/451248/Nnake-to-hit-it-off-in-Egypt-top-flight
 http://africanfootball.com/news/464732/Injury-hit-Nnake-debuts-for-Egyptian-club
 http://africanfootball.com/news/507177/Nnake-is-super-sub-for-Egyptian-club
 https://i.prcdn.co/img?regionKey=%2BHbACAiy2BYkPptDMCD1HQ%3D%3D

1989 births
Living people
Nigerian footballers
Expatriate footballers in Belgium
Expatriate footballers in Egypt
Expatriate footballers in Saudi Arabia
Nigerian expatriate footballers
Royale Union Saint-Gilloise players
Dolphin F.C. (Nigeria) players
Nigerian expatriate sportspeople in Belgium
Nigerian expatriate sportspeople in Egypt
Nigerian expatriate sportspeople in Saudi Arabia
Sharks F.C. players
Kwara United F.C. players
Tersana SC players
Al-Hejaz Club players
Sabah F.C. (Malaysia) players
Sportspeople from Port Harcourt
Pyramids FC players
Saudi Second Division players
Egyptian Premier League players
Association football forwards